Girlguiding Cymru (Welsh: Bysowch Barod Cymru) is one of the nine regions of Girlguiding UK. It serves the approximate area of Wales, although the boundaries are not exact. In 2004, there were 6,964 youth participant groups.

Until 1938 Wales was administered from Headquarters in London. From 1918 to 1938 there were Deputy Chief Commissioners. In 1938 the Council for Wales was formed and a Standing Committee was appointed. Lady Blythswood was appointed Chief Commissioner in the same year.

Counties

Girlguiding Cymru is split into 14 Girlguiding Counties. These counties are broadly based on the historic counties of Wales except that Glamorgan is split into three, Denbighshire and Flintshire are combined into "Clwyd" and Monmouthshire is referred to as "Gwent".

Anglesey
Breconshire
Caernarfonshire
Cardiff and East Glamorgan
Carmarthenshire
Central Glamorgan
Ceredigion
Clwyd
Gwent
Merioneth
Montgomeryshire
Pembrokeshire
Radnorshire
West Glamorgan

Broneirion

Broneirion is a Victorian house and grounds on the hillside across the River Severn from the village of Llandinam. It became the Welsh Training Centre in 1946. In 1992 it became the property of Girlguiding Cymru after a campaign that raised £510000 for the purchase and an endowment fund. Both the house and grounds are used for training and camping activities, and the site is used by Guides, other organisations and private groups.

Ynysgain

Ynysgain is the Girlguiding Cymru camp and holiday centre in Criccieth, Gwynedd. It has indoor accommodation and camping areas.

Early Guiding in Wales

The 1st Carmarthen Company was the first Guide Company to be registered in Wales. Prior to 1910, some girls from Wales were registered as Scouts.

See also

Scouting in Wales
The Scout Association

References

External links
 Girlguiding Cymru

Girlguiding
Organisations based in Wales with royal patronage